Jornet may refer to:

 Josep Maria Benet i Jornet (b. 1940), Spanish playwright and screenwriter
 Kílian Jornet Burgada (b. 1987), Catalunyan extreme sports athlete
 Naila Jornet Burgada (b. 1989), Catalunyan ski mountaineer
 St. Teresa of Jesus Jornet (1843–1897), Spanish foundress of the Little Sisters of the Poor

Catalan-language surnames